Amylin Pharmaceuticals is a biopharmaceutical company based in San Diego, CA, that was founded in 1987. The company was engaged in the discovery, development and commercialization of drug candidates for the treatment of diabetes, obesity and other diseases. Amylin produced three drugs: Symlin (pramlintide acetate), Byetta (exenatide) and Bydureon (exenatide extended-release).

History

1987-1992: Founding and IPO 
In 1987, Amylin Pharmaceuticals was co-founded by Howard E. Greene Jr., former CEO of San Diego biotech pioneer Hybridtech, to develop a treatment for diabetes from a synthetic analog of amylin.  Amylin was discovered by researchers at Oxford University earlier that year.  Greene served as CEO from 1987 to 1996.  Amylin completed its IPO in 1992.

1992 - 1998: Invention of Pramlintide & Partnership with Johnson & Johnson 
Amylin, in its natural form, is sticky—it clumps on needles and forms little rocks in the pancreas. Researchers first had to create a synthetic version that they could work with more easily and reliably. The inventors at Amylin Pharmaceuticals—Laura Gaeta, Howard Jones, and Elisabeth Albrecht—altered amino acids in the molecule and created a new drug named pramlintide.

In 1995, Amylin Pharmactietucals signed an agreement with Johnson & Johnson's LifeScan division to further develop pramlintide.  A Phase II study made public in January 1997 showed pramlintide was safe to mix with leading short-acting and intermediate-acting commercial insulin products, with preliminary results suggesting it might improve glucose control.

Initial Phase III trial results released in August 1997 showed pramlintide did show statistically significant results for type 1 (juvenile-onset) diabetes, helping modestly to improve glucose control without increasing the risk of hypoglycemia (low blood sugar) while also improving weight and cholesterol levels. But adult-onset type 2 diabetes affects far more people than type 1, and pramlintide showed significant benefits only at 6 months but not after 12 months.  In March 1998, seven months before the next trial data were due, J&J discontinued its partnership with Amylin.

1998 - 2005: New Leadership, Struggle to Launch Pramlintide (Symlin), Development of Byetta (Exenatide) 
Joseph C. Cook Jr., a 28-year veteran at Eli Lilly & Co. and an Amylin board member since 1994, came out of retirement in 1998 to help the company recover its footing, taking the title of chief executive officer.  Cook reduced the company's workforce by 75 percent to conserve cash and raised capital from investors to keep Symlin (pramlintide's commercial name) moving through the regulatory pipeline.

Symlin (Pramlintide) 
In October 2001, Amylin received an approvable letter for Symlin from the FDA, requiring additional clinical data addressing concerns of severe hypoglycemia in type 1 diabetics for approval.  In December 2003, the FDA issued a second approvable letter requesting further clinical data to identify a patient population and method of use for Symlin where there is no increased risk of significant hypoglycemia or where there is an added benefit that clearly counterbalances any potential for increases in episodes of hypoglycemia.  In March 2005, Symlin was approved by the FDA for use in diabetics who have difficulty maintaining glycemic control.

Byetta (Exenatide) 
In October 1996, Dr. John Eng licensed his discovery, exendin-4 to Amylin.  Dr. Eng discovered exendin-4 in the venom of a Gila monster.  Exendin-4 is similar to the human gut hormone GLP-1, which is responsible for regulating insulin and glucagon release.  Unlike human GLP-1, however, exendin-4 doesn’t degrade for hours, making it a much better candidate for a drug.  Amylin developed exenatide, a synthetic version of exendin-4.  In 2002, Eli Lilly signed an agreement with Amylin for $325 million to partner in development of exenatide.  In May 2005, Byetta (commercial name for exenatide) was approved in the United States.

2005 - 2009: Development of Bydureon, Proxy Battle

2011 - 2012: End of collaboration with Eli Lilly and Acquisition 
In July 2012, Bristol-Myers Squibb announced it would acquire Amylin Pharmaceuticals for $5.3 billion.  As part of the acquisition, AstraZeneca made a $3.4 billion cash payment to make Amylin a wholly owned subsidiary within the existing BMS/AZ joint venture in diabetes.  In April 2013, Bristol-Myers Squibb announced it would close Amylin's San Diego operations by the end of 2014 and merge the Amylin manufacturing facility in West Chester, Ohio and all field-based sales personnel into Bristol-Myers Squibb operations.

In December 2013, AstraZeneca purchased the Bristol-Myers Squibb share of the diabetes joint venture, and as a result, became the sole owner of all former Amylin products and business, including the manufacturing facility in West Chester, Ohio.

On February 4, 2014, the U.S. FDA approved Myalept (metreleptin), an analog of human leptin, as replacement therapy to treat the complications of leptin deficiency, in addition to diet, in patients with congenital generalized or acquired generalized lipodystrophy.  Metraleptin was originally developed at Amylin Pharmaceuticals.  In November 2014, Aegerion Pharmaceuticals made a $325 million cash payment to AstraZeneca to acquire and commercialize metreleptin.

References

External links

Pharmaceutical companies disestablished in 2012
Defunct pharmaceutical companies of the United States
Companies based in San Diego
Health care companies based in California
Biotechnology companies of the United States
Biotechnology companies established in 1987
Pharmaceutical companies established in 1987
Companies formerly listed on the Nasdaq
Life sciences industry
Biopharmaceutical companies
1992 initial public offerings
2012 mergers and acquisitions
Bristol Myers Squibb
AstraZeneca